Milena Rašić (born 25 October 1990) is a retired Serbian professional volleyball player. She played for Serbia women's national volleyball team. She won a silver medal at the 2016 Summer Olympics and also competed at the 2012 Summer Olympics. She won a bronze medal at the 2020 Summer Olympics.

Career

Having been part of the Serbian team that finished in last place at the London Olympics, Rašić was part of the Serbian team that won the silver medal at the 2016 Summer Olympics.

Rašić won the 2016–17 CEV Champions League gold medal with VakıfBank Istanbul when her team defeated the Italian Imoco Volley Conegliano 3-0 and she was also awarded Best Middle Blocker. She won the bronze medal of the 2017 FIVB World Grand Prix and the Best Middle Blocker individual award.

Awards

Individual awards
2011 World Grand Prix "Best Spiker"
2013 World Grand Prix "Best Middle Blocker"
2014–15 CEV Champions League "Best Middle Blocker"
2015–16 Turkish Women's Volleyball League "Best Middle Blockers"
2016 Olympic Games "Best Middle Blocker"
2016 FIVB Club World Championship "Best Middle Blocker"
2016–17 CEV Champions League "Best Middle Blocker"
2017 World Grand Prix "Best Middle Blocker"
2017–18 CEV Champions League "Best Middle Blocker"
2018 FIVB World Championship "Best Middle Blocker"
2018 FIVB Women's Club World Championship "Best Middle Blocker"

Clubs
 2016–17 CEV Champions League -  Champion, with VakıfBank Istanbul
 2017–18 CEV Champions League -  Champion, with VakıfBank
 2017 Club World Championship -  Champion, with VakıfBank
 2018 Club World Championship -  Champion, with VakıfBank
 2017 Turkish Super Cup -  Champion, with VakıfBank
 2017–18 Turkish League -  Champion, with VakıfBank
 2018–19 Turkish League -  Champion, with VakıfBank
 2019 FIVB Club World Championship –  Bronze medal, with VakıfBank
 2021 Turkish Cup -  Champion, with VakıfBank S.K.
 2020–21 Turkish League -  Champion, with VakıfBank
 2020-21 CEV Champions League -  Runner-Up, with Vakıfbank S.K.

Gallery

References

External links
 

1990 births
Serbian women's volleyball players
Living people
Olympic volleyball players of Serbia
Volleyball players at the 2012 Summer Olympics
Sportspeople from Pristina
Kosovo Serbs
Volleyball players at the 2015 European Games
European Games medalists in volleyball
European Games bronze medalists for Serbia
Volleyball players at the 2016 Summer Olympics
Olympic silver medalists for Serbia
Olympic medalists in volleyball
Medalists at the 2016 Summer Olympics
European champions for Serbia
Expatriate volleyball players in France
Expatriate volleyball players in Turkey
Serbian expatriate sportspeople in France
Serbian expatriate sportspeople in Turkey
VakıfBank S.K. volleyballers
Universiade medalists in volleyball
Universiade silver medalists for Serbia
Medalists at the 2009 Summer Universiade
Volleyball players at the 2020 Summer Olympics
Medalists at the 2020 Summer Olympics
Olympic bronze medalists for Serbia
21st-century Serbian women